Localized heat contact urticaria is a cutaneous condition, one of the rarest forms of urticaria, where within minutes of contact with heat from any source, itching and wheals occur at the precise site of contact, lasting up to 1 hour.

See also 
 Drug-induced urticaria
 List of cutaneous conditions

References 

Urticaria and angioedema